The men's team road race cycling event at the 1936 Olympic Games took place on 10 August and was one of six events at the 1936 Olympics. It was competed as a 100 km massed start event in conjunction with the Men's individual road race. Teams had four riders and the team time taken as sum of the team's three best finishers. Only the first five teams across the line recorded a time, due to a failure with the timekeeping system.

Results

Final

References

Road cycling at the 1936 Summer Olympics
Cycling at the Summer Olympics – Men's team road race